Henry Menzies (28 March 1867 – 7 March 1936) was an English first-class cricketer active 1891–93 who played for Middlesex. He was born in Lambeth; died in North Farnborough.

References

1867 births
1936 deaths
English cricketers
Middlesex cricketers